Qelish Baghi (also Romanized as Qelish Bāghī; also known as Ghelich Baghi, Kalashbāgh, Qelīch Bāghī, and Qelīj Bāghī) is a village in Ali Sadr Rural District, Gol Tappeh District, Kabudarahang County, Hamadan Province, Iran. At the 2006 census, its population was 533, in 109 families.

References 

Populated places in Kabudarahang County